Jean (Judy) Birmingham  is a prominent English historical archaeologist, who has been based in Sydney, Australia, for most of her career.

Biography 
Birmingham received her MA in Classics from the University of St Andrews in 1953 and latter attended the UCL Institute of Archaeology and received her MA in Archaeology from there in 1959. In 1961, an opening for an Iron Age specialist was created at the University of Sydney, and Birmingham was recommended for the post. Birmingham and her then-husband Michael travelled to Australia, where she taught as a lecturer, specialising in Iron Age Cyprus and Anatolia.

In 1966, Birmingham began to look for sites close to Sydney where her students could get basic training in archaeological techniques. In 1967, Birmingham began running excavations at the site of Irrawang Pottery, the pottery works owned by James King at Irrawang just north of Newcastle. This project is considered to be one of the first examples of historical archaeology in Australia.

In 1973, Birmingham and historian Ian Jack proposed teaching a course in historical archaeology at the University of Sydney. As detailed by Jack, the course proposal was fought by the conservative members of the archaeology department; however the proposal was accepted and the first course in historical archaeology in Australia was taught by Birmingham, Jack, geographer Dennis Jeans and historian Ken Cable. The course also had a significant fieldwork component to give student essential practical training.

Contribution to professional organisations 
Birmingham was instrumental in forming the Australasian Society for Historical Archaeology (ASHA), which was founded as the Australian Society for Historical Archaeology in 1970. ASHA began at the University of Sydney and developed because of Birmingham's enthusiasm for historical archaeology. She edited early issues of the ASHA Newsletter, organised special publications and conferences. She served as the society's first secretary (1970-1980), and later served as president (1980-1991).

Birmingham was a Founder Member of Australia ICOMOS and contributed to the drafting of the Burra Charter. Birmingham was also an active member of the National Trust of Australia, including acting as Chairman of its Industrial Archaeology Committee (1969-1985).

Awards and honours 
In recognition of her contributions to ASHA, Birmingham was made an Honorary Life Member of the association. ASHA has also created an annual award named in her honour, the "Judy Birmingham Award for Best Historical Archaeology Consulting Report".

In 2001, Birmingham was awarded by the Australian Government a Centenary Medal for "service to Australian society and the humanities in prehistory and archaeology" and in 2017 she was awarded a Member of the Order of Australia for "significant service to higher education, particularly to historical archaeology, as an academic, and to professional associations."

Partial bibliography
Zagora (1972), (Birmingham et al.), Sydney Up,  
Old Sydney Burial Ground 1974, (Birmingham et al.), Australian Society for Historical Archaeology, 
Australian Pioneer Technology. Sites and Relics (1979), (Birmingham et al.), Heinemann Educational Australia, 
10,000 Years of Sydney Life (1980), (Peter Stanbury, with Judy Birmingham, editor),  The Macleay Museum, the University of Sydney, 
Industrial archaeology in Australia: Rural industry (1983), (Judy Birmingham),   Heinemann Publishers Australia, 
Castle Hill Archaeological Report (1984), (Birmingham et al.), 
Papers in Australian Historical Archaeology, (Birmingham et al.)
Archaeology and Colonisation (1988), (Birmingham et al.),  American Society of Civil Engineers,  
Transformations. The Art of Recycling (2000), (Birmingham et al.)

See also
 Industrial archaeology
A Life in Archaeology: In Conversation with Judy Birmingham.

References

Australian archaeologists
Australian women archaeologists
Living people
English archaeologists
British women archaeologists
Alumni of the UCL Institute of Archaeology
Members of the Order of Australia
Year of birth missing (living people)